Sonnet 10 is one of 154 sonnets written by the English playwright and poet William Shakespeare. It is a procreation sonnet within the Fair Youth sequence.

In the sonnet, Shakespeare uses a rather harsh tone to admonish the young man for his refusal to fall in love and have children. It also continues and amplifies the theme of "hatred against the world" which appears rather suddenly in the last couplet of Sonnet 9. The two sonnets may be said therefore to be linked (like Sonnets 5 and 6 or Sonnets 15 and 16) even though the linkage takes a different form.

Structure

Sonnet 10 is a typical English or Shakespearean sonnet. The English sonnet consists of three quatrains followed by a couplet, and follows the typical rhyme scheme of the form: . It is written in iambic pentameter, a type of poetic metre based on five pairs of metrically weak/strong syllabic positions per line. Line ten exemplifies a regular iambic pentameter line:

  ×    /    ×  /  ×   /       ×   /  ×   / 
Shall hate be fairer lodged than gentle love? (10.10)

...while the first two lines exhibit, respectively, a final extrametrical syllable (or feminine ending), and a likely initial reversal:

 ×    /    × /   ×    /   ×       /    × /(×)
For shame deny that thou bear'st love to any,

  /  ×    ×  /   ×    / ×   / × / 
Who for thy self art so unprovident. (10.1-2)
/ = ictus, a metrically strong syllabic position. × = nonictus. (×) = extrametrical syllable.

Though this is not the only possible scansion of the first two lines, the extra emphasis demanded by "thou" to prevent the ictus from resting on "bear'st", and the extra emphasis falling on "who" in an initial reversal, may be seen as pointing up the accusatory tone in the poem.

Synopsis and analysis
The procreation theme is repeated, though for the first time a personal relationship between the poet and the youth is stated, even to the extent that the youth is asked to have a child to please the poet.  In looking after himself alone the youth is accused of being "unprovident", of not disposing of his wealth properly and of not thinking of the future (pro + videre = to look in advance).

The poem stresses the charm of the youth. According to Shakespeare, the youth must concede ("Grant"), if he is so disposed ("if thou wilt"), that he is loved by many, as was Narcissus, who in Golding's words, "the hearts of divers trim yong men his beautie gan to move, / And many a Ladie fresh and faire was taken in his love." Like Narcissus, who "to be toucht of man or Mayde . . wholy did disdaine," the youth also refuses to be touched by or to love another.

The middle lines toy with imagery of political rebellion, mentioning conspiracies and destruction of houses. The youth is like the biblical house, which if it "be deuided agaynst it selfe, that house can not continue" (Mark 3.25; BB). The verse was used of the house of Satan and was a familiar topic of sermons.

The youth is also instructed to "change thy thought", a change similar to the biblical imperative of metanoia, to change one's mind, often translated as "repent", so that the poet will be of a different "mind" or memory.

References

Further references
Baldwin, T. W. (1950). On the Literary Genetics of Shakspeare's Sonnets. University of Illinois Press, Urbana.
Hubler, Edwin (1952). The Sense of Shakespeare's Sonnets. Princeton University Press, Princeton.
Schoenfeldt, Michael (2007). The Sonnets: The Cambridge Companion to Shakespeare's Poetry. Patrick Cheney, Cambridge University Press, Cambridge.

External links

Paraphrase of sonnet in modern language
Analysis of the sonnet

British poems
Sonnets by William Shakespeare